County Kerry, Ireland is home to a wide range of fortified castle structures. The castles below are referenced by the Irish National Grid on Ordnance Survey maps.

Overview
Castles and maps listed below are sourced mainly from the Discovery (Irish TV) series. The series attributed the maps below (Scale: 1:50 000) to Ordnance Survey, the Irish national mapping agency. Most of the listed castles and forts clearly indicated on the maps and are accessible to walkers and the general public. Some maps use the older SCALE 1:126,720 from the series published in 1986.

Map Sheets Covering Kerry
O.S. Sheet 63 - North West Kerry & Shannon Estuary, Listowel.
O.S. Sheet 64 - North East Kerry, Tarbert & Newcastlewest.
O.S. Sheet 70 - Dingle Peninsula
O.S. Sheet 71 - Tralee & Tralee Bay
O.S. Sheet 72 - Cork, Kerry & Limerick Borders 
O.S. Sheet 78 - South Kerry, Killarney & Kenmare 
O.S. Sheet 79 - South East Kerry, Cork & Kerry Borders.
O.S. Sheet 83 - Caherciveen & Valentia. 
O.S. Sheet 84 - Kenmare River
O.S. Sheet 85 - South Kerry, Bantry

Editions
 O.S. SCALE 1:126,720 Edition, published 1986 (Half Inch to One mile)
 Discovery Series, 3rd Edition, published 2005 (2 centimetres to 1 Kilometre)
 Discovery Series, 4th Edition, published 2010

Key to column headings
Structure
Listed as "Castle" or "Promontory Fort", markings of "Dun Cinn Tire" and "Signal Tower" are also included.
O.S. Sheet
Refers to the Ordnance Survey sheet on which the structure can be found.
N.G. Segment
National Grid segment in which the structure is located. Each grid segment covers an actual area of 1 square kilometre.
V
The number of the Vertical, N-S, line of the National Grid system.
H
The number of the Horizontal, E-W, line of the National Grid system.
The structure to be located will then lie in the square to the North East of the intersecting H/V lines.
Type
 "Castle" - generally of Celtic or Norman construction 
 "Promontory Fort"- generally built about 1500 BC, 
 "Dun Cinn Tire" is the Irish language translation of "Promontory Fort" 
 "Signal Tower" - These are probably of Norman Construction
Near
Some general reference point clearly marked on the map or generally, well known; a town, village, harbour, headland or road etc.
Comment
Nearest main road or road, e.g. N 22 or R 559. If structure is easily accessible? Visibility of site from road.
Marked
As some castles are obliterated, the location of the sites are listed, as in the case of Tralee Castle. Because their position and prominence was historically important, the known information is entered so that a more comprehensive understanding of the area and era may be obtained.

Table

Further reading
 Discovering Kerry by T.J. Barrington, Blackwater Dublin (1976) 
 Kerry Landing, August 1922 by Niall C. Harrington. Anvil Books Limited (1992).  
 The Castles of the Kingdom of Kerry by Michael J. Carroll. Bantry Designs (2004) 
 A Pictorial History of Tralee by Russell McMorran and Maurice O'Keeffe. Kingdom Printers Ltd. (2005)  
 The Dingle Peninsula - 18 walks Through its Heritage by Maurice Sheehy. Kingdom Printers Ltd, Tralee. (1986) No ISBN

Castles in County Kerry
County Kerry, Ireland
County Kerry, Ireland
Castles